Frank Thomas Robertson Giles (31 July 1919 – 30 October 2019) was an English journalist, historian and diplomat, who was editor of the British Sunday Times newspaper from 1981 to 1983, having served as its foreign editor (1961–1977) and then deputy editor (1967–1981) under his predecessor Harold Evans. He stood down in the wake of the Hitler Diaries scandal.

Biography
Giles was the only son of Colonel Frank Lucas Netlam Giles (1879–1930), DSO (1915), OBE (1923), and Elgiva Mary Ackland-Allen (1890–1970). In 1946, he married Lady Katherine Pamela Sackville ('Kitty'), only daughter of the 9th Earl De La Warr; they had three children, the youngest of whom, Belinda, is married to television broadcaster David Dimbleby.

In 1940, the young Bermuda Government House ADC Giles encountered the Edward, Duke of Windsor and his wife Wallis Simpson during their brief visit on their way to the Bahamas. Giles described his impressions at the time most lucidly in his memoirs.
He thought that Wallis was: 'a very clever woman, … She is not intrinsically beautiful or handsome but she has a good complexion, regular features and a beautiful figure....More than all the charm of her physical appearance, though, is her manner: she has, to an infinite degree, that really great gift of making you feel that you are the very person whom she has been waiting all her life to meet... With old and young and clever and stupid alike she exercises this charm and during the week she was here, during which she met a number of people, I never saw anyone who could resist the spell — they were all delighted and intrigued… She is never anything but stately, and when she had to wave to the crowds on her arrival, and subsequently whenever we drove through [Hamilton], she did it with ease and charm and grace which suggested that she had been at it all her life.”
On returning from Hamilton with a pair of swimming trunks the former king told the ADC: It’s I who wear the shorts in this family, you know.

In his review (New York Times, 17 January 1993) of Rupert Murdoch, Murdoch by William Shawcross (New York: Simon & Schuster, 1993) Andrew Sullivan wrote:
'THE best story in this sprightly, undemanding biography of the media entrepreneur Rupert Murdoch is apocryphal. When Mr. Murdoch fired Frank Giles as editor of The Sunday Times of London in 1983, he proposed that Mr. Giles assume the title "editor emeritus" for the two years remaining before his retirement. Mr. Giles asked what on earth "editor emeritus" meant. "It's Latin, Frank," Mr. Murdoch reportedly replied. " E means 'exit' and meritus means 'you deserve it.'"

Giles published a memoir in 1986, Sundry Times. In his retirement, he lived in London. He turned 100 in July 2019 and died on 30 October that year.

He was a member of the Society of Dilettanti, Brooks's Club, and Beefsteak Clubs and a member of the St James's Club. In 2009, his 'Hobbies and other interests' were listed as 'Wine (especially claret and burgundy), opera, watercolor painting, visiting his holiday home in northern Corfu, Greece'.

Bibliography
 Frank Giles: Sundry Times. London, John Murray, 1986. .
 Frank Giles: A prince of journalists, the life and times of Henri Stefan Opper de Blowitz. Lasalle, Open Court, 1974.  (1st ed.: London, Faber and Faber, 1962).
 Frank Giles: Napoleon Bonaparte: England's Prisoner, Carroll & Graf (New York, NY), 2001.
(Editor) Corfu: The Garden Isle, presented by Count Spiro Flamburiari, photographs by Fritz von der Schulenburg and Christopher Simon Sykes, John Murray (London) and Abbeville Press (New York, NY), 1994.
Frank Giles: The Locust Years: The Story of the Fourth French Republic, 1946–1958, Secker & Warburg (London, England), 1991, Carroll & Graf (New York, NY), 1994.

References

1919 births
2019 deaths
20th-century British journalists
20th-century English historians
20th-century English memoirists
Alumni of Brasenose College, Oxford
British diplomats
British Army personnel of World War II
British newspaper editors
English Anglicans
English centenarians
English male journalists
English newspaper editors
Men centenarians
People educated at Wellington College, Berkshire
The Sunday Times people
The Times people